Patricia Siewert (born 23 September 1956) is a German former swimmer. She competed in the women's 100 metre breaststroke at the 1972 Summer Olympics.

References

External links
 

1956 births
Living people
German female swimmers
Olympic swimmers of West Germany
Swimmers at the 1972 Summer Olympics
Sportspeople from Heilbronn